Arrothia is a genus of moths of the family Noctuidae.

Species
 Arrothia bicolor Rothschild, 1896
 Arrothia gueneianum Viette, 1954

References
 Arrothia at Markku Savela's Lepidoptera and Some Other Life Forms
 Natural History Museum Lepidoptera genus database

Agaristinae